Urania has been borne by at least three ships of the Italian Navy and may refer to:

 , a  launched in 1891 and discarded in 1912.
 , a  launched in 1943.
 , a  launched in 1986 and sold in 2016 to Bangladesh for coastguard service. She was renamed CGS Mansoor Ali. 

Italian Navy ship names